Modisimus culicinus is a species of cellar spider in the family Pholcidae. It is found in South America, has been introduced into Germany, Czech Rep., Zaire, Seychelles, Sri Lanka, Indonesia, China, Australia, and Pacific Islands.

References

Pholcidae
Articles created by Qbugbot
Spiders described in 1893